Georges Heywaert (born 1 September 1897, date of death unknown) was a Belgian fencer. He competed in the individual and team sabre events at the 1936 Summer Olympics.

References

1897 births
Year of death missing
Belgian male fencers
Belgian sabre fencers
Olympic fencers of Belgium
Fencers at the 1936 Summer Olympics